Dragoș Protopopescu (17 October 1892 – 11 April 1948) was a Romanian writer, poet, critic and philosopher. 

He was born in Călărași, the son of Constantin Popescu and Octavia Blebea. 
After going to school in his native city, he pursued his studies at the Saint Sava High School in Bucharest, and then at the Faculty of Letters of the University of Bucharest. He continued his education at the University of Paris, where he obtained in 1924 a PhD in English studies, with a thesis about William Congreve written under the direction of Louis Cazamian. 

In 1925 Protopopescu was named professor at the University of Cernăuți. From 1926 to 1927 he was the director of the  National Theater in Cernăuți, where he hired Grigore Vasiliu Birlic in his first role. After serving as press attaché at the Romanian Legation in London (1928–1930), he became professor at the University of Bucharest, and served for a while as dean of the School of English Language and Literature in the Department of Letters at the university. 

Politically, Protopopescu supported the fascist and antisemitic organization known as the Iron Guard, and he published the newspaper Buna Vestire, which was aligned with the Guard. He also actively contributed to other Romanian newspapers such as Flacăra, Vieața Nouă, Cuget Românesc, Cuvântul, Gândirea, Lumea Nouă, Cuvântul Studențesc, Vremea and Porunca Vremii.  He was arrested and imprisoned in spring 1934 and detained at Jilava Prison during the crackdown on the Iron Guard by King Carol II's dictatorship. In 1937 he was elected to the Chamber of Deputies on the list of the "Totul pentru Țară" party.

In 1948 Protopopescu was arrested again by the communist authorities. He tried to commit suicide by cutting his veins. He was sent to a hospital in Bucharest and then arrested again by the Securitate. He made a new and successful attempt at suicide: leaning over an elevator shaft, he was decapitated by the cabin.

Books 

 Pagini engleze, București, Editura Cultura Națională, 1925
 Fenomenul englez: studii și interpretări, București, Fundația pentru Literatură și Artă „Regele Carol II”, 1936 (reed. 1996; 2003)
 Shakespeare: viața și opera, ediție îngrijită de Fabian Anton, București, Editura Eurosong & Book, 1998

References 

1892 births
1948 suicides
20th-century Romanian philosophers
People from Călărași
Romanian writers
Romanian philosophers
Members of the Iron Guard
20th-century Romanian politicians
Academic staff of Chernivtsi University
Suicides in Romania
Deaths by decapitation
20th-century poets
Romanian university and college faculty deans
Academic staff of the University of Bucharest
University of Paris alumni
University of Bucharest alumni
Saint Sava National College alumni